Mungyeong College, also known as Mun Kyung College, is a private technical college in Mungyeong city, North Gyeongsang province, South Korea.  It is located in Hogye-myeon, on the outskirts of Jeomchon.  It was established as Mun Kyung Technical College (문경전문대학) in 1990, and took on its present name in 1995.

Mungyeong College currently employs about 34 instructors.  Specializations include information technology, tourism, and early childhood education.  Enrollment fluctuates around 1000 students.

See also
Education in South Korea

External links 
 Official website 

Universities and colleges in North Gyeongsang Province
Mungyeong
Educational institutions established in 1990
1990 establishments in South Korea